"Wisemen" is a song written by British singer James Blunt, Jimmy Hogarth and Sacha Skarbek for Blunt's 2004 debut album Back to Bedlam. The song was produced by Tom Rothrock and Jimmy Hogarth. The song was released as the second single in the first quarter of 2005 and reached the top 50 in the United Kingdom, peaking at number 44. Following the success of "You're Beautiful" and "Goodbye My Lover", "Wisemen" was re-released in the spring of 2006, number 21 in New Zealand, and at number 23 in the UK. The song was met with positive reviews.

Music videos
The first music video, released in tandem with the first UK release of the single, has Blunt and his band performing in the Café de Paris in London. The only occupants of the café are three middle-aged men, supposedly businessmen, who are accompanied by a young woman. The woman stands and begins to dance in the middle of the room but is ignored by the men. Three masked men, supposedly the wisemen, then enter and kidnap Blunt, putting him into a car and driving to the shore where he is imprisoned in a hastily constructed shack by the seaside, in reference to the lyric, "Those three wisemen, they've got a semi by the sea." The masks were constructed from moulds cast from Blunt's own face. The first music video was filmed in December 2004 and directed by Mark Davis.

The second version, which was released in tandem with the UK re-release of the single, has Blunt burning his personal papers and passport in a forest before slowly internally combusting. This video has been released to the US market. During a guest-hosting slot on the BBC2 programme "Never Mind The Buzzcocks", Blunt was asked what the line meant and said that "Semi" referred to a "semi-automatic rifle". The second music video was filmed on 3 February 2006 and directed by Paul Minor.

Release
"Wisemen" was first released on 7 March 2005 on three physical formats. The CD single includes an exclusive live performance of "No Bravery". The DVD includes the original video for "Wisemen", exclusive "Making Of" footage and a live audio recording of "Out of My Mind". The 7-inch vinyl includes a live performance of "Billy". The re-release, issued on 13 March 2006, was also available on three physical formats, containing a similar track listing. CD1 includes a live performance of "Out of My Mind", taken from the initial DVD single; CD2 includes the live performances of "No Bravery" and "Out of My Mind", plus the video for "Wisemen"; and the limited edition one-sided 7-inch vinyl features "Wisemen" only. In Australia, the single was released on 17 April 2006.

Chart performance
During its original release, "Wisemen" became Blunt's first single not to chart within the top 40 on the UK Singles Chart, peaking at number 44. Following its UK re-release, the song became his fourth top-40 single when it peaked at number 23 on the same chart, spending a total of six weeks in the top 75. It reached number 11 in Australia and became his third single to reach the top 20. In Canada, the song became an airplay hit, reaching number three on the BDS Airplay chart.

Track listings

2005
CD
 "Wisemen" - 3:45
 "No Bravery" (Live) - 3:24

DVD
 "Wisemen" (Audio) - 3:45
 "Wisemen" (Video) - 3:50
 "High" (Video) - 3:45
 "Wisemen" (The Making of the Video) - 3:00

7-inch vinyl
 "Wisemen" - 3:45
 "Billy" (Live) - 4:12

2006
CD1
 "Wisemen" - 3:45
 "Out of My Mind" (Live at the Bowery Ballroom, NYC) - 3:22

CD2
 "Wisemen" - 3:45
 "No Bravery" (Live) - 3:16
 "Out of My Mind" (Live at the Bowery Ballroom, NYC) - 3:00

7-inch vinyl
 "Wisemen" - 3:45

Personnel
 James Blunt – lead vocals, classical guitar, organ, Rhodes piano
 Jimmy Hogarth – acoustic guitar, keyboards
 John Nau – Hammond organ, Wurlitzer electric piano
 Sacha Skarbek – Rhodes piano
 John Goodwin – electric guitar
 Amanda Ghost – backing vocals
 Sasha Krivtsov – bass guitar
 Charlie Paxton – drums

Charts

Weekly charts

Year-end charts

Certifications

References

2004 songs
2005 singles
2006 singles
James Blunt songs
Songs written by James Blunt
Songs written by Jimmy Hogarth
Songs written by Sacha Skarbek
Custard Records singles
Atlantic Records singles
Songs about bullying
Song recordings produced by Tom Rothrock